Littell is an unincorporated community in Lewis County, Washington, United States, located off Washington State Route 6 between the towns of Adna and Claquato. The Willapa Hills Trail passes thru the area. A pedestrian bridge was begun to be built in Littell in 2021, allowing users of the trail to pass over the highway to lessen vehicular accidents.

History

Two versions of who created the town exist. A manager of the Hill Logging Company, Harry J. Syverson, asserted in 1912 to have founded the town however there are sourced claims that a local businessman, Curt Littell, agreed to call the post office under his name in 1902. A post office was moved from the nearby town of Claquato in 1903 and an opera house was built in the town in 1904.

Notable people
Roy Huggins, producer, screenwriter, creator of television series The Rockford Files, The Fugitive and Maverick; born in Littell.
James A. Wright, Wisconsin state senator and lumberman, was president of the Wisconsin Lumber Company located in Littell; Wright organized the company in 1904.

References

Populated places in Lewis County, Washington
Unincorporated communities in Lewis County, Washington
Unincorporated communities in Washington (state)